Elijah Campbell (born August 24, 1995) is an American football cornerback for the Miami Dolphins of the National Football League (NFL). After playing college football for Iowa Western, Northern Illinois, and Northern Iowa, he signed with the Cleveland Browns as an undrafted free agent in 2018. He also played for the Birmingham Iron of the Alliance of American Football (AAF) and DC Defenders of the XFL.

College career
Campbell began his college career at the junior college role for the Iowa Western Community College football team. There, in 2014 he contributed to their undefeated season and played in the Junior College National Championship. He then transferred to play for the Northern Illinois Huskies football team in 2015 before transferring again to play for the Northern Iowa Panthers football team in 2016 and 2017.

Professional career

Cleveland Browns
Campbell signed with the Cleveland Browns as an undrafted free agent following the 2018 NFL Draft on May 4, 2018. He was waived before the start of the regular season on August 31, 2018.

Birmingham Iron
Campbell signed with the Birmingham Iron of the AAF in November 2018. He made the roster out of training camp in February 2019, but after playing eight weeks of games, the league ceased operations in April 2019.

DC Defenders
Campbell was selected by the DC Defenders of the XFL with the fourth overall selection in the defensive backs phase of the 2020 XFL Draft on October 16, 2019. He played in four games for the Defenders, and had his contract terminated when the league suspended operations on April 10, 2020.

New York Jets
Campbell signed with the New York Jets' practice squad on November 3, 2020. He was elevated to the active roster on December 5 for the team's week 13 game against the Las Vegas Raiders, and reverted to the practice squad after the game. He was promoted to the active roster on December 8. Campbell was waived on August 31, 2021.

Miami Dolphins
Campbell was claimed off waivers by the Miami Dolphins on September 1, 2021. He was placed on injured reserve on November 27.

On March 8, 2022, Campbell re-signed with the Dolphins.

On March 7, 2023, the Dolphins tendered Campbell.

References

External links
New York Jets bio
Northern Iowa Panthers football bio

1995 births
Living people
People from Saint Paul, Minnesota
Players of American football from Minnesota
American football defensive backs
Northern Iowa Panthers football players
Cleveland Browns players
Birmingham Iron players
DC Defenders players
New York Jets players
Miami Dolphins players
Iowa Western Reivers football players
Northern Illinois Huskies football players